Eëtion may refer to:

In Greek mythology:
Eëtion, king of the Cilician Thebe mentioned in the Iliad
Eëtion, ruler over the island of Imbros mentioned in the Iliad; he buys Priam's captured son Lycaon and restores him to his father
Eëtion, a Greek soldier who was killed by Paris

In Greek history:
Eëtion, the father of Cypselus, the first tyrant of Corinth.

In biology:
Eetion (skipper), a genus of grass skipper butterflies of the tribe Erionotini